The aardwolf is a mammal in the hyena family.

Aardwolf may also refer to:
 
 Aardwolf (CIA report), a report about a country's status discussed in State of War: The Secret History of the CIA and the Bush Administration
 Aardwolf (comics), a Marvel Comics character
 Aardwolf Publishing, a publishing company founded by Clifford Meth

See also
Aardvark